Joseph Arriola (born June 9, 1995) is an American professional wrestler currently signed to WWE where he performs on the NXT brand under the ring name Tony D'Angelo.

Professional wrestling career
On the October 5, 2021 episode of NXT, Ariola made his WWE debut under the ring name Tony D'Angelo, with the heel gimmick of an Italian-American mobster, defeating Malik Blade in a few minutes. On December 5, at NXT WarGames, D'Angelo, Bron Breakker, Carmelo Hayes and Grayson Waller defeated Team Black & Gold (Johnny Gargano, LA Knight, Pete Dunne and Tommaso Ciampa) in a WarGames match.

After a series of victories against Ru Feng, Dexter Lumis and Andre Chase, D'Angelo suffered his first loss against Dunne on the December 21 episode of NXT 2.0, then brutally attacking Dunne himself with a crowbar. As a result of the feud that ensued, D'Angelo defeated Dunne in a Crowbar On a Pole match at the January 11, 2022 episode of NXT 2.0. On the January 25 episode of NXT 2.0, D'Angelo lost to Cameron Grimes due to interference from Dunne, failing to challenge him for the NXT North American Championship. On the February 15 episode of NXT Vengeance Day, D'Angelo lost to Dunne in a Weaponized Steel Cage match. On April 2, at NXT Stand & Deliver, D'Angelo pinned Tommaso Ciampa. On June 4, at NXT In Your House, D'Angelo and his henchmen Channing "Stacks" Lorenzo and Troy "Two Dimes" Donovan defeated Legado del Fantasma and, as per the stipulation, this stable had to join the D'Angelo Family. On the June 21 episode of NXT 2.0, D'Angelo was defeated by Carmelo Hayes, missing out on an opportunity to capture the NXT North American Championship, due to Santos Escobar interfering. On the August 2 episode of NXT 2.0, D'Angelo and Lorenzo faced The Creed Brothers for the NXT Tag Team Championship but were defeated due to Escobar's interference. On the August 16 special episode NXT Heatwave, D'Angelo defeated Escobar in a Street Fight and, as per the stipulation, Legado del Fantasma had to remain linked to the D'Angelo Family, while Escobar had to leave NXT (kayfabe).

On the September 27 episode of NXT, D'Angelo faced Wes Lee to qualify for a ladder match for the vacant NXT North American Championship at NXT Halloween Havoc but was defeated via referee decision. On the December 27 episode of NXT, D'Angelo then faced Lee for the NXT North American Championship but, due to interference from Dijak, he lost the match. On January 10, 2023, at NXT: New Year's Evil, D'Angelo lost to Dijak.

Championships and accomplishments
Pro Wrestling Illustrated
Ranked No. 182 of the top 500 singles wrestlers in the PWI 500 in 2022

References

External links

1995 births
Living people
Sportspeople from Oak Park, Illinois
Professional wrestlers from Illinois
American male professional wrestlers
21st-century professional wrestlers